Morgan Jones (February 26, 1830 – July 13, 1894) was an American businessman and politician who served one term as a U.S. Representative from New York from 1865 to 1867.

Biography 
Born in London, England, Jones immigrated in 1833 to the United States with his parents, who settled in New York City. He engaged in the plumbing business in 1850. He served as a member of the board of councilmen 1859–1863 and president of that body in 1860, 1861, and 1863. He served as a member of the board of aldermen in 1864 and 1865, the latter in which he served as president of the board.

Congress 
Jones was elected as a Democrat to the Thirty-ninth Congress (March 4, 1865 – March 3, 1867).

Later career and death 
He resumed business interests in New York City until 1887, when he retired. He died in that city July 13, 1894.

He was interred in Green-Wood Cemetery, Brooklyn, New York.

References

External links

1830 births
1894 deaths
Burials at Green-Wood Cemetery
Democratic Party members of the United States House of Representatives from New York (state)
British emigrants to the United States
American people of Welsh descent
19th-century American politicians
Politicians from London